Bucculatrix gossypina is a moth in the family Bucculatricidae. It was described by Jean Ghesquière in 1940. It is found in the Democratic Republic of the Congo. 

Bucculatrix gossypina larvae feed on Gossypium species.

References

External links

Bucculatricidae
Moths described in 1940
Moths of Africa